Pygmephorus is a genus of large mites, in the family Pygmephoridae.

Species 

 P. lambi
 P. lutterloughae

References 

Trombidiformes genera